Studio Sessions New York 1963 is the fourth volume of The Private Collection a series of recordings made by American pianist, composer and bandleader Duke Ellington for his personal collection which was first released on the LMR label in 1987 and later on the Saja label.

Reception
The Allmusic review by Scott Yanow awarded the album 4 stars and stated "filled with previously unknown Ellington compositions, a stockpile of fresh material well worth a full investigation by contemporary musicians. Throughout all but the four full-band tracks, the focus is on cornetist Ray Nance, who is the only brass player present on most of this set. Johnny Hodges, Jimmy Hamilton and Paul Gonsalves also receive a good sampling of solo space on this strong entry in The Private Collection program. ".

Track listing
:All compositions by Duke Ellington except as indicated
 "Bad Woman" - 4:36  
 "Jeep's Blues" (Ellington, Johnny Hodges) - 4:08  
 "Stoona" - 4:33  
 "Serenade to Sweden" - 2:38  
 "Harmony in Harlem" (Ellington, Hodges, Irving Mills) - 4:20  
 "Action in Alexandria" - 2:31  
 "Tajm" - 3:21  
 "Isfahan" (Ellington, Billy Strayhorn) - 3:19  
 "Killian's Lick" - 4:30  
 "Blousons Noir" - 3:46  
 "Elysee" (Strayhorn) - 2:25  
 "Butter and Oleo!" - 4:37  
 "Got Nobody Now" (Hodges) - 2:36  
 "M.G." - 2:54  
 "Blue Rose" - 2:47  
 "July 18th Blues" - 5:32  
Recorded at A& R Studio, New York on April 17 (tracks 2, 9, 13 & 14), April 18 (tracks 10-12 & 15), May 15 (tracks 1& 3-5), and July 18, 1963 (tracks 6-8 & 16).

Personnel
Duke Ellington – piano
Ray Nance - cornet 
Cat Anderson, Rolf Ericson, Eddie Preston, Cootie Williams - trumpet (tracks 6-8 & 16)
Lawrence Brown, Buster Cooper - trombone (tracks 6-8 & 16)
Chuck Connors - bass trombone (tracks 6-8 & 16)
Johnny Hodges, Russell Procope - alto saxophone 
Jimmy Hamilton - clarinet, tenor saxophone 
Paul Gonsalves - tenor saxophone 
Harry Carney - baritone saxophone 
Ernie Shepard - bass 
Sam Woodyard - drums

References

Saja Records albums
Duke Ellington albums
1987 albums